The following outline is provided as an overview of and topical guide to Angola:

Angola – country in southern Africa bordered by Namibia on the south, the Democratic Republic of the Congo on the north, and Zambia on the east; its west coast is on the Atlantic Ocean with Luanda as its capital city. The exclave province of Cabinda has borders with the Republic of the Congo and the Democratic Republic of the Congo. The country has vast mineral and petroleum reserves, and its economy has on average grown at a two-digit pace since the 1990s, especially since the end of the civil war. In spite of this, standards of living remain low, and life expectancy and infant mortality rates in Angola are among the worst-ranked in the world.

General reference 

 Pronunciation: 
 Common English country name: Angola
 Official English country name: The Republic of Angola
 Common endonym(s): A
 Official endonym(s): A
 Adjectival(s): Angolan 
 Demonym(s): Angolans
 International rankings of Angola
 ISO country codes: AO, AGO, 024
 ISO region codes: See ISO 3166-2:AO
 Internet country code top-level domain: .ao

Geography of Angola 

Geography of Angola
 Angola is: a country
 Population of Angola: 33,086,278 people - 42nd most populous country
 Area of Angola: 1,246,700 km2 - 23rd largest country
 Atlas of Angola

Location 
Angola lies in Southern Africa, bordering the South Atlantic Ocean, between Namibia and the Democratic Republic of the Congo.

 Angola is situated within the following regions:
 Eastern Hemisphere and Southern Hemisphere
 Africa
 Middle Africa
 Southern Africa
 Time zone:  West Africa Time (UTC+01)
 Extreme points of Angola
 High:  Morro de Môco 
 Low:  South Atlantic Ocean 0 m
 Land boundaries:  5,198 km
 2,511 km
 1,376 km
 1,110 km
 201 km
 Coastline:  1,600 km

Environment of Angola 

 Climate of Angola
 Ecoregions in Angola
 Protected areas in Angola
 Wildlife of Angola
 Fauna of Angola
 Birds of Angola
 Mammals of Angola

Natural geographic features of Angola 

 Glaciers in Angola: None 
 Islands of Angola
 Rivers of Angola
 World Heritage Sites in Angola: None

Regions of Angola 

Regions of Angola
Angola is divided into eighteen provinces:
Bengo
Benguela
Bié
Cabinda
Cuando Cubango
Cuanza Norte
Cuanza Sul
Cunene
Huambo
Huíla
Luanda
Lunda Norte
Lunda Sul
Malanje
Moxico
Namibe
Uíge
Zaire

Ecoregions of Angola 

List of ecoregions in Angola

Administrative divisions of Angola 

Administrative divisions of Angola
 Provinces of Angola
 Municipalities of Angola

Provinces of Angola 

Provinces of Angola
Angola is divided into eighteen provinces:
Bengo
Benguela
Bié
Cabinda
Cuando Cubango
Cuanza Norte
Cuanza Sul
Cunene
Huambo
Huíla
Luanda
Lunda Norte
Lunda Sul
Malanje
Moxico
Namibe
Uíge
Zaire

Municipalities of Angola 

Municipalities of Angola
 Cities of Angola
 Capital of Angola: Luanda

Bengo Province

Ambriz
Dande
Icolo e Bengo
Nambuangongo
Quicama

Benguela Province

Baia Farta
Balombo
Benguela
Bocoio
Caimbambo
Chongoroi
Cubal
Ganda
Lobito

Bié Province

Andulo
Camacupa
Catabola
Chinguar
Chitembo
Cuemba
Cunhinga
Kuito
N'harea

Cabinda Province

Belize
Buco-zau
Cabinda
Landana

Cuando Cubango Province

Calai
Cuangar
Cuchi
Cuito Cuanavale
Dirico
Mavinga
Menongue
Nankova
Rivungo

Cuanza Norte Province

Ambaca
Banga
Bolongongo
Bula Atumba
Cambambe
Cazengo
Dembos
Golungo Alto
Gonguembo
Lucala
Pango Aluquem
Quiculungo
Samba Caju

Cuanza Sul Province

Amboim
Cassongue
Conda

Ebo
Libolo
Mussende
Porto Amboim
Quibala
Quilenda
Seles
Sumbe
Waku-Kungo

Cunene Province

Cahama
Cuanhama
Curoca
Cuvelai
Namacunde
Ombadja

Huambo Province

Bailundo
Caála
Ekunha
Huambo
Katchiungo
Londuimbali
Longojo
Mungo
Tchikala-tcholo
Tchindjenje
Ukuma

Huíla Province

Caconda
Caluquembe
Chiange
Chibia
Chicomba
Chipindo
Humpata
Kuvango
Lubango
Matala
Quilengues
Quipungo

Luanda Province

Cacuaco
Luanda
Viana

Lunda Norte Province

Cambulo
Capenda Camulemb
Caungula
Chitato
Cuango
Cuilo
Lubalo
Lucapa
Xa-muteba

Lunda Sul Province

Cacolo
Dala
Muconda
Saurimo

Malanje Province

Cacuso
Calandula
Cambundi-catembo
Cangandala
Caombo
Kiwaba N'zogi
Kunda Dia-baze
Luquembo
Malaje
Marimba
Massango
Mucari
Quela
Quirima

Moxico Province

Alto Zambeze
Camanongue
Leua
Luacano
Luau
Kangamba
Lumbala N'guimbo
Lumege
Moxico

Namibe Province

Bibala
Camacuio
Namibe
Tombua
Virei

Uíge Province

Alto Cauale
Ambuila
Bembe
Buengas
Bungo
Damba
Maquela Do Zombo
Mucaba
Negale
Puri
Quimbele
Quitexe
Santa Cruz
Sanza Pombo
Songo
Uige

Zaire Province

Cuimba
M'banza Congo
N'zeto
Noqui
Soyo
Tomboco

Demography of Angola 

Demographics of Angola

Government and politics of Angola 

Politics of Angola
 Form of government: presidential republic
 Capital of Angola: Luanda
 Elections in Angola
 Angolan presidential elections
 1992
 2009
 Angolan parliamentary elections
 1980
 1986
 1992
 2008
 2012
 2017

 Political parties in Angola

Branches of the government of Angola 

Government of Angola

Executive branch of the government of Angola 
 Head of state: President of Angola
 Head of government: President of Angola
 Vice President of Angola

Legislative branch of the government of Angola 

 National Assembly of Angola (unicameral)

Judicial branch of the government of Angola 

Court system of Angola

Foreign relations of Angola 

Foreign relations of Angola
 Diplomatic missions in Angola
 Diplomatic missions of Angola

International organization membership 
The Republic of Angola is a member of:

African Development Bank Group (AfDB)
African Union (AU)
African, Caribbean, and Pacific Group of States (ACP)
Comunidade dos Países de Língua Portuguesa (CPLP)
Food and Agriculture Organization (FAO)
Group of 77 (G77)
International Atomic Energy Agency (IAEA)
International Bank for Reconstruction and Development (IBRD)
International Civil Aviation Organization (ICAO)
International Criminal Court (ICCt) (signatory)
International Criminal Police Organization (Interpol)
International Development Association (IDA)
International Federation of Red Cross and Red Crescent Societies (IFRCS)
International Finance Corporation (IFC)
International Fund for Agricultural Development (IFAD)
International Labour Organization (ILO)
International Maritime Organization (IMO)
International Monetary Fund (IMF)
International Olympic Committee (IOC)
International Organization for Migration (IOM)
International Organization for Standardization (ISO) (correspondent)
International Red Cross and Red Crescent Movement (ICRM)

International Telecommunication Union (ITU)
International Telecommunications Satellite Organization (ITSO)
International Trade Union Confederation (ITUC)
Inter-Parliamentary Union (IPU)
Multilateral Investment Guarantee Agency (MIGA)
Nonaligned Movement (NAM)
Organization of American States (OAS) (observer)
Organization of Petroleum Exporting Countries (OPEC)
Southern African Development Community (SADC)
União Latina
United Nations (UN)
United Nations Conference on Trade and Development (UNCTAD)
United Nations Educational, Scientific, and Cultural Organization (UNESCO)
United Nations Industrial Development Organization (UNIDO)
Universal Postal Union (UPU)
World Customs Organization (WCO)
World Federation of Trade Unions (WFTU)
World Health Organization (WHO)
World Intellectual Property Organization (WIPO)
World Meteorological Organization (WMO)
World Tourism Organization (UNWTO)
World Trade Organization (WTO)

Angola is one of only seven U.N. members which is not a member of the Organisation for the Prohibition of Chemical Weapons.

Law and order in Angola 

Law of Angola
 Constitution of Angola
 Human rights in Angola
 LGBT rights in Angola
 Freedom of religion in Angola
 Law Enforcement in Angola

Military of Angola 

Military of Angola
 Command
 Commander-in-chief:
 Forces
 Army of Angola
 Navy of Angola
 Air Force of Angola
 Military history of Angola

History of Angola 

History of Angola

History of Angola, by period 
Precolonial history
Colonial history
War of independence
Civil War period
Post-war period

History of Angola, by subject 
 History of rail transport in Angola
 History of the Jews in Angola
 Military history of Angola

Culture of Angola 

Culture of Angola
 Architecture of Angola
 Cuisine of Angola
 Languages of Angola
 Media in Angola
 National symbols of Angola
 Coat of arms of Angola
 Flag of Angola
 National anthem of Angola
 Demographics of Angola
 Prostitution in Angola
 Public holidays in Angola
 Religion in Angola
 Christianity in Angola
 Hinduism in Angola
 Islam in Angola
 Judaism in Angola
 World Heritage Sites in Angola: none

Art in Angola 
 Cinema of Angola
 Literature of Angola
 Music of Angola
 Television in Angola

Sports in Angola 

Sports in Angola
 Angola at the Olympics
 Basketball in Angola
 Football in Angola
 Angola national football team

Economy and infrastructure of Angola 

Economy of Angola
 Economic rank, by nominal GDP (2007):  61st (sixty first)
 Agriculture in Angola
 Banking in Angola
 National Bank of Angola
 Communications in Angola
 Internet in Angola
 Companies of Angola
 Currency of Angola: Kwanza
ISO 4217: AQA
 Energy in Angola
 Energy in Angola
 Health in Angola
 Health care in Angola
 Mining in Angola
 Angola Stock Exchange and Derivatives
 Tourism in Angola
 Transport in Angola
 Airports in Angola
 Rail transport in Angola

Education in Angola 

Education in Angola
History of education in Angola
List of schools in Angola
List of universities in Angola

Health in Angola 

Health in Angola
 HIV/AIDS in Angola

See also 

Angola

Index of Angola-related articles
List of Angola-related topics
List of international rankings
Member state of the United Nations
Outline of Africa
Outline of geography

References

External links

 

 The World Factbook
Government
Embassy of Angola in Washington DC
Embassy of Angola in Ottawa, Canada
Portuguese
Republic of Angola (official government portal)
National Assembly of Angola
News
Canal Angola Everything that have to do with Angolan Music and Culture
Mwangole News about music from Angola and events, Videos, Mp3
children of Angola – a web documentary on the forgotten children of Angola.
- Newspapers from Angola – The most important online newspapers from Angola.
Mwangole Amizades Angola Dating, relationship, and more
allAfrica - Angola – News headline links
Angola Press – Government-controlled news agency (in Portuguese, French and English)
Angonoticias (in Portuguese) – A popular news source in Angola
Mangole (in Portuguese) – A full news source in Angola and web directory of Angolan sites online
Televisão Pública de Angola (in Portuguese) – Angola's state-owned national TV station
Rádio Nacional de Angola (in Portuguese) – Angola's state-owned national radio station
Jornal de Angola (in Portuguese) – The state-owned daily newspaper in Angola
400 Years Ago – Washington Post news story on the possible fate of the first African slaves taken to US.
 – "Amputee Beauty Pageant Crowns Miss Landmine 2008" news story about new beauty pageant in Angola for women who lost limbs in landmines amidst the nation's civil war.

Politics
Official webpage of MPLA
Official webpage of UNITA
Official webpage of JMPLA

Overviews
BBC - Country profile: Angola
Angola. The World Factbook. Central Intelligence Agency.
US State Department - Angola includes Background Notes, Country Study and major reports
OECD DEV/AfDB - Country Study: Angola
Rural poverty in Angola (IFAD)
World Bank Country Brief: Angola

Directories
Columbia University Libraries - Angola directory category of the WWW-VL

Stanford University - Africa South of the Sahara: Angola directory category
www.angolinks.com - webdirectory of Angolan sites online
Encyclopedia of the Nations: Angola
World Intellectual Property Handbook: Angola

Other
Can Corporate Power Transform Equatorial Guinea and Angola?
Angola Conflict Briefing
www.luandamap.com - streetsearch in Luanda and other maps related to Angola
www.cidadeluanda.com - Portal and Directory of Luanda

Angola
Angola